Vedder Mountain is a mountain in Greene County, New York. It is located in the Catskill Mountains east-northeast of Lawrenceville. Bethel Ridge is located southwest, and Timmerman Hill is located south-southwest of Vedder Mountain.

References

Mountains of Greene County, New York
Mountains of New York (state)